Long Live Belarus! is a Belarusian patriotic motto widely used by members of the Belarusian democratic and nationalist opposition as well as members of the Belarusian diaspora.

The motto is aimed at awakening the national civil sense, the consolidation of the Belarusian people to protect the freedom and independence of their country, language, and  national culture.

History 

Belarusian poet Janka Kupała ended his 1905–1907 poem "This is a Cry That Belarus Lives" with this phrase.

In December 1917, the First All-Belarusian Congress displayed the flag with the inscription "Long Live Free Belarus!".

It is displayed on the logo of a major state-owned newspaper, Narodnaya Gazeta. However, there have been cases of arrests for publicly calling out the motto at demonstrations.

The phrase has been widely used by opponents of President Alexander Lukashenko, both inside and outside of Belarus, during the 2020 Belarusian protests.

See also 
 Kastuś Kalinoŭski
 Viva Belarus!
 Slava Ukraini

References

Belarusian nationalism
National mottos
National symbols of Belarus